In any narrative, the focal character is the character on whom the audience is meant to place the majority of their interest and attention. They are almost always also the protagonist of the story; however, in cases where the "focal character" and "protagonist" are separate, the focal character's emotions and ambitions are not meant to be empathized with by the audience to as high an extent as the protagonist (this is the main difference between the two character terms). The focal character is mostly created to simply be the "excitement" of the story, though not necessarily the main character about whom the audience is emotionally concerned. The focal character is, more than anyone else, "the person on whom the spotlight focuses; the center of attention; the man whose reactions dominate the screen."

For example, in Gaston Leroux's The Phantom of the Opera, the protagonist is Christine Daaé (the audience is concerned mostly with her emotions, aims, and well-being), while the focal character is the "Phantom" (the audience is concerned mostly with the allure of his actions and reactions—though to some degree, later on, his emotions as well). In another example, in "The Fall of the House of Usher" by Edgar Allan Poe, the protagonist of the story is unnamed and does not have a great effect on the story, though he is present. He does not show much emotion throughout the story, and the reader is not as interested in him. The focal character of the story is Roderick Usher, whom the reader cares for more greatly and follows his condition and emotions more.

The focal character is also not necessarily the same thing as the viewpoint character, through whose perspective the story is seen. In Sir Arthur Conan Doyle's works of Sherlock Holmes, Watson is the viewpoint character, but the story revolves around Holmes, making him the focal character.

References

External links

Narratology